Lily Pond may refer to:

 Lily Pond, a lake in Nova Scotia, Canada
 Lily Pond, Georgia, an  unincorporated community in the United States
 Lily Pond Avenue, an artery in the New York City borough of Staten Island

See also
 LilyPond, music software
 Lily Lake (disambiguation)
 Prankers Pond, in Saugus, Massachusetts, also known as Lily Pond
 Water Lilies (Monet series), of which several include "Lily Pond" in their title